The Sage Type 3 (also known as the Sage N3 School) was a prototype British biplane training aircraft of the First World War. It was unsuccessful, only two examples being built.

Development and design
In 1916, the British Admiralty placed a contract with Frederick Sage & Co, a Peterborough-based woodworking company which had become an aircraft contractor for the Royal Navy, to design and build a primary trainer for the Royal Naval Air Service. It was required to be robust, with a low landing speed and good visibility. The resultant design, the Sage Type 3, was a two-bay tractor biplane powered by a Rolls-Royce Hawk engine.  In order to prevent the aircraft overturning during landing, it was fitted with an additional pair of wheels ahead of the mainwheels.

The first prototype Type 3 flew on 5 January 1917. It proved to be slow, even for a trainer, and was modified with smaller tail surfaces and reduced weight, becoming the Type 3b (with the original design retrospectively designated Type 3a), which slightly improved performance. However, after a second aircraft was built, the contract was cancelled, and the remaining aircraft of the contract for 30 Type 3s were unbuilt.  The type did form the basis for the Sage Type 4 floatplane, which was ordered into production but cancelled due to the end of the war.

Specifications (Type 3b)

See also

Notes

References

Bruce, J. M. British Aeroplanes 1914-18. London: Putnam, 1957.
""Milestones" The Sage Machines". Flight, 24 July 1919, pp. 971–975.
Uppendaun, Bob. "Sage-Like Thoughts:The Products of Frederick Sage & Co". Air Enthusiast, No.110, March/April 2004, pp. 68–69. 

1910s British military trainer aircraft
Type 3
Biplanes
Single-engined tractor aircraft
Aircraft first flown in 1917